Championship Manager is the first game in the Championship Manager series as well as the Football Manager series of association football management simulation games. The game was released on the Amiga and Atari ST in September, 1992 and ported to MS-DOS soon after. The game was written by Paul and Oliver Collyer (the co-founders of Sports Interactive) in their bedroom.

Gameplay
The game featured four playable English divisions (First through to Fourth; the newly formed FA Premier League did not appear until CM 93/94). In the game, each division contained only 20 teams, whereas in real life they contained 22 or 24 teams at that time.
Also included were all of the major domestic cups of the time (including the Anglo-Italian Cup) and the 3 major European trophies (including the now defunct Cup Winners' Cup).

Any teams outside of the four playable divisions and all foreign teams had no player names at all. Instead, players were simply called "No.3" or "No.10" depending on which position they played.

One of the most innovative things about the game was the introduction of "average ratings" for players - after each match the performance of every player was graded from 0-10 and as the season went on the player's average rating would allow the manager to easily see how each player was performing.

Other versions
In 1993, Intelek and Ubisoft used the Collyers' game code to produce a version for the French market, known as Guy Roux Manager (named after the legendary AJ Auxerre manager). It was fully localised for France and included the French first and second divisions as playable leagues, and all text and commentary in French. The Guy Roux Manager franchise has since become a very popular and long running franchise in France with games on many platforms.

Also in 1993, the first Norwegian version was released; a year later, an Italian version. While the Norwegian version was very much similar to the English one, in the Italian version it was possible to substitute up to 4 players in any game and the transfer deadline occurred much earlier in the season. Both the Norwegian and Italian versions featured real named players though, adding to the popularity of the game.

Development
Electronic Arts reportedly turned down the chance to publish Championship Manager in 1992. Subsequently, the release of this first version of the game was not an outstanding success and sales were steady rather than spectacular. Reviews ranged from the encouraging to the dismissive.

Even by early 1990s standards, the graphics of Championship Manager were primitive and there were many other management games available that were much more visually pleasing, such as Premier Manager and The Manager. Critics berated the lack of any real graphics, other than coloured text on top of a background image and the complete lack of any sound effects. Also, what became known as the "match engine" was very basic, consisting of a clock, 3 small meters showing each team's possession and lines of text commentary describing the match action. Rival game, The Manager, included a small screen showing TV-style clips of match action. Another drawback was the absence of real player names, as each team was populated with players generated at random by the computer.

Sales
The game sold more than 5 million copies by 2004.

See also
 Football Manager (1982 series)

References

External links
 Reviews at classicgaming.com- A website containing several old magazine reviews of Championship Manager
 Official game info- Championship Manager 1 section on the official Sports Interactive website

1992 video games
Amiga games
Atari ST games
Domark games
DOS games
Video games scored by Barry Leitch
Association football management video games
Video games developed in the United Kingdom